The 2008–09 Atlanta Hawks season was the team's 60th season of the franchise in the National Basketball Association (NBA) and the 41st in Atlanta. It ended on Monday, May 11, 2009, with a loss at home to the Cleveland Cavaliers in the second round of the playoffs in a sweep.

Key dates
June 26: The 2008 NBA draft took place in New York City.
July 1: The free agency period started.

Draft picks

The Hawks did not have any draft picks in the 2008 NBA draft.

Roster

Roster Notes
 Othello Hunter was born and raised in the U.S., but is also a Liberian citizen.

Regular season

Standings

Record vs. opponents

Game log

|- bgcolor="#ccffcc"
| 1
| October 29
| @ Orlando
| 
| Joe Johnson (25)
| Josh Smith (10)
| Mike Bibby, Al Horford (4)
| Amway Arena17,461
| 1–0

|- bgcolor="#ccffcc"
| 2
| November 1
| Philadelphia
| 
| Joe Johnson (35)
| Josh Smith (11)
| Joe Johnson (5)
| Philips Arena19,651
| 2–0
|- bgcolor="#ccffcc"
| 3
| November 5
| @ New Orleans
| 
| Joe Johnson (24)
| Josh Smith (11)
| Joe Johnson, Al Horford, Mike Bibby (4)
| New Orleans Arena16,030
| 3–0
|- bgcolor="#ccffcc"
| 4
| November 7
| Toronto
| 
| Mike Bibby (19)
| Solomon Jones (9)
| Mike Bibby (12)
| Philips Arena18,290
| 4–0
|- bgcolor="#ccffcc"
| 5
| November 9
| @ Oklahoma City
| 
| Joe Johnson (25)
| Al Horford (12)
| Mike Bibby (4)
| Ford Center18,231
| 5–0
|- bgcolor="#ccffcc"
| 6
| November 11
| @ Chicago
| 
| Al Horford (27)
| Al Horford (17)
| Joe Johnson (8)
| United Center21,738
| 6–0
|- bgcolor="#ffcccc"
| 7
| November 12
| @ Boston
| 
| Joe Johnson (28)
| Maurice Evans, Zaza Pachulia, Solomon Jones (5)
| Joe Johnson (7)
| TD Banknorth Garden18,624
| 6–1
|- bgcolor="#ffcccc"
| 8
| November 14
| @ New Jersey
| 
| Joe Johnson (32)
| Al Horford (11)
| Joe Johnson (5)
| Izod Center15,309
| 6–2
|- bgcolor="#ffcccc"
| 9
| November 15
| New Jersey
| 
| Joe Johnson (31)
| Marvin Williams, Al Horford, Solomon Jones (6)
| Mike Bibby (7)
| Philips Arena18,729
| 6–3
|- bgcolor="#ffcccc"
| 10
| November 18
| @ Indiana
| 
| Joe Johnson (25)
| Zaza Pachulia (8)
| Mike Bibby (5)
| Conseco Fieldhouse13,379
| 6–4
|- bgcolor="#ccffcc"
| 11
| November 19
| Washington
| 
| Mike Bibby (25)
| Zaza Pachulia (18)
| Joe Johnson (8)
| Philips Arena14,416
| 7–4
|- bgcolor="#ccffcc"
| 12
| November 21
| Charlotte
| 
| Joe Johnson (30)
| Marvin Williams, Maurice Evans (10)
| Joe Johnson (8)
| Philips Arena15,068
| 8–4
|- bgcolor="#ffcccc"
| 13
| November 22
| @ Cleveland
| 
| Maurice Evans (21)
| Al Horford (9)
| Acie Law (7)
| Quicken Loans Arena20,562
| 8–5
|- bgcolor="#ccffcc"
| 14
| November 26
| Milwaukee
| 
| Al Horford (21)
| Al Horford (9)
| Joe Johnson (9)
| Philips Arena15,730
| 9–5
|- bgcolor="#ffcccc"
| 15
| November 28
| @ Toronto
| 
| Mike Bibby (24)
| Zaza Pachulia (17)
| Joe Johnson (7)
| Air Canada Centre19,200
| 9–6
|- bgcolor="#ccffcc"
| 16
| November 29
| @ Washington
| 
| Mike Bibby (21)
| Al Horford (13)
| Mike Bibby, Al Horford (6)
| Verizon Center18,110
| 10–6

|- bgcolor="#ccffcc"
| 17
| December 3
| Memphis
| 
| Joe Johnson (26)
| Zaza Pachulia, Josh Smith (6)
| Mike Bibby (10)
| Philips Arena12,088
| 11–6
|- bgcolor="#ccffcc"
| 18
| December 5
| New York
| 
| Marvin Williams (18)
| Al Horford (9)
| Mike Bibby (9)
| Philips Arena16,366
| 12–6
|- bgcolor="#ffcccc"
| 19
| December 6
| @ Dallas
| 
| Joe Johnson (32)
| Zaza Pachulia (12)
| Mike Bibby (5)
| American Airlines Center19,966
| 12–7
|- bgcolor="#ffcccc"
| 20
| December 9
| @ Houston
| 
| Joe Johnson (22)
| Josh Smith (11)
| Josh Smith, Joe Johnson (4)
| Toyota Center16,439
| 12–8
|- bgcolor="#ffcccc"
| 21
| December 10
| @ San Antonio
| 
| Joe Johnson (29)
| Al Horford (7)
| Mike Bibby (7)
| AT&T Center18,161
| 12–9
|- bgcolor="#ccffcc"
| 22
| December 12
| @ Miami
| 
| Joe Johnson (21)
| Al Horford (10)
| Mike Bibby (8)
| American Airlines Arena19,600
| 13–9
|- bgcolor="#ccffcc"
| 23
| December 13
| Cleveland
| 
| Mike Bibby (24)
| Al Horford, Josh Smith (8)
| Joe Johnson (8)
| Philips Arena19,200
| 14–9
|- bgcolor="#ccffcc"
| 24
| December 15
| Charlotte
| 
| Joe Johnson (28)
| Al Horford (14)
| Joe Johnson (8)
| Philips Arena12,733
| 15–9
|- bgcolor="#ffcccc"
| 25
| December 17
| Boston
| 
| Joe Johnson (20)
| Al Horford (11)
| Joe Johnson, Josh Smith, Al Horford (4)
| Philips Arena18,729
| 15–10
|- bgcolor="#ccffcc"
| 26
| December 19
| Golden State
| 
| Marvin Williams (22)
| Marvin Williams (9)
| Josh Smith, Mike Bibby (7)
| Philips Arena16,768
| 16–10
|- bgcolor="#ccffcc"
| 27
| December 21
| Detroit
| 
| Mike Bibby (27)
| Al Horford (11)
| Joe Johnson (7)
| Philips Arena15,233
| 17–10
|- bgcolor="#ccffcc"
| 28
| December 23
| Oklahoma City
| 
| Marvin Williams (21)
| Joe Johnson (11)
| Joe Johnson (11)
| Philips Arena12,138
| 18–10
|- bgcolor="#ccffcc"
| 29
| December 27
| Chicago
| 
| Joe Johnson (41)
| Al Horford (10)
| Joe Johnson (8)
| Philips Arena18,031
| 19–10
|- bgcolor="#ccffcc"
| 30
| December 29
| Denver
| 
| Joe Johnson (25)
| Al Horford (10)
| Mike Bibby (9)
| Philips Arena17,131
| 20–10
|- bgcolor="#ccffcc"
| 31
| December 30
| @ Indiana
| 
| Joe Johnson (27)
| Al Horford (14)
| Mike Bibby (6)
| Conseco Fieldhouse13,762
| 21–10

|- bgcolor="#ffcccc"
| 32
| January 2
| @ New Jersey
| 
| Mike Bibby (22)
| Joe Johnson (9)
| Joe Johnson (9)
| Izod Center16,851
| 21–11
|- bgcolor="#ccffcc"
| 33
| January 3
| Houston
| 
| Josh Smith (29)
| Al Horford (6)
| Joe Johnson (14)
| Philips Arena16,740
| 22–11
|- bgcolor="#ffcccc"
| 34
| January 7
| Orlando
| 
| Josh Smith (21)
| Al Horford (13)
| Mike Bibby, Joe Johnson (9)
| Philips Arena13,748
| 22–12
|- bgcolor="#ffcccc"
| 35
| January 9
| @ Orlando
| 
| Acie Law (16)
| Solomon Jones (8)
| Joe Johnson (4)
| Amway Arena17,461
| 22–13
|- bgcolor="#ffcccc"
| 36
| January 11
| Philadelphia
| 
| Joe Johnson (25)
| Zaza Pachulia (6)
| Joe Johnson (9)
| Philips Arena15,079
| 22–14
|- bgcolor="#ffcccc"
| 37
| January 13
| @ Phoenix
| 
| Josh Smith (24)
| Marvin Williams (12)
| Joe Johnson, Mike Bibby (3)
| US Airways Center18,422
| 22–15
|- bgcolor="#ccffcc"
| 38
| January 14
| @ L.A. Clippers
| 
| Josh Smith (26)
| Josh Smith (8)
| Joe Johnson (7)
| Staples Center15,901
| 23–15
|- bgcolor="#ffcccc"
| 39
| January 16
| @ Golden State
| 
| Joe Johnson (25)
| Zaza Pachulia (8)
| Mike Bibby (7)
| Oracle Arena18,832
| 23–16
|- bgcolor="#ccffcc"
| 40
| January 19
| Toronto
| 
| Joe Johnson (28)
| Josh Smith (14)
| Mike Bibby (5)
| Philips Arena17,199
| 24–16
|- bgcolor="#ccffcc"
| 41
| January 20
| @ Chicago
| 
| Mike Bibby (31)
| Josh Smith (14)
| Joe Johnson (8)
| United Center20,389
| 25–16
|- bgcolor="#ccffcc"
| 42
| January 23
| Milwaukee
| 
| Ronald Murray (25)
| Marvin Williams (9)
| Mike Bibby (15)
| Philips Arena18,556
| 26–16
|- bgcolor="#ffcccc"
| 43
| January 25
| Phoenix
| 
| Josh Smith (19)
| Josh Smith (12)
| Joe Johnson (13)
| Philips Arena19,153
| 26–17
|- bgcolor="#ffcccc"
| 44
| January 26
| @ Miami
| 
| Joe Johnson (19)
| Josh Smith (10)
| Joe Johnson (4)
| American Airlines Arena18,103
| 26–18
|- bgcolor="#ffcccc"
| 45
| January 28
| @ New York
| 
| Marvin Williams (28)
| Josh Smith (12)
| Joe Johnson, Mike Bibby (7)
| Madison Square Garden18,180
| 26–19
|- bgcolor="#ccffcc"
| 46
| January 30
| New Jersey
| 
| Joe Johnson (29)
| Marvin Williams (11)
| Josh Smith (6)
| Philips Arena17,561
| 27–19
|- bgcolor="#ffcccc"
| 47
| January 31
| @ Milwaukee
| 
| Mike Bibby (24)
| Josh Smith (11)
| Joe Johnson (9)
| Bradley Center15,881
| 27–20

|- bgcolor="#ccffcc"
| 48
| February 4
| @ Minnesota
| 
| Mike Bibby (24)
| Marvin Williams (10)
| Mike Bibby (7)
| Target Center13,745
| 28–20
|- bgcolor="#ccffcc"
| 49
| February 6
| @ Charlotte
| 
| Marvin Williams (29)
| Zaza Pachulia (8)
| Mike Bibby, Al Horford (4)
| Time Warner Cable Arena15,140
| 29–20
|- bgcolor="#ffcccc"
| 50
| February 7
| L.A. Clippers
| 
| Joe Johnson, Marvin Williams (17)
| Josh Smith (15)
| Acie Law (6)
| Philips Arena18,729
| 29–21
|- bgcolor="#ccffcc"
| 51
| February 10
| Washington
| 
| Joe Johnson (22)
| Zaza Pachulia (12)
| Joe Johnson (8)
| Philips Arena17,027
| 30–21
|- bgcolor="#ccffcc"
| 52
| February 11
| @ Detroit
| 
| Joe Johnson (27)
| Marvin Williams (8)
| Josh Smith (7)
| The Palace of Auburn Hills20,124
| 31–21
|- bgcolor="#ffcccc"
| 53
| February 17
| @ L.A. Lakers
| 
| Joe Johnson (14)
| Zaza Pachulia (12)
| Joe Johnson (5)
| Staples Center18,997
| 31–22
|- bgcolor="#ccffcc"
| 54
| February 18
| @ Sacramento
| 
| Mike Bibby (29)
| Al Horford (18)
| Joe Johnson (6)
| ARCO Arena11,213
| 32–22
|- bgcolor="#ffcccc"
| 55
| February 20
| @ Portland
| 
| Mike Bibby (27)
| Joe Johnson (8)
| Joe Johnson (7)
| Rose Garden20,250
| 32–23
|- bgcolor="#ffcccc"
| 56
| February 23
| @ Utah
| 
| Joe Johnson (15)
| Al Horford, Zaza Pachulia, Marvin Williams (6)
| Ronald Murray, Al Horford (5)
| EnergySolutions Arena19,911
| 32–24
|- bgcolor="#ffcccc"
| 57
| February 25
| @ Denver
| 
| Marvin Williams (31)
| Al Horford (11)
| Joe Johnson (8)
| Pepsi Center18,418
| 32–25
|- bgcolor="#ccffcc"
| 58
| February 27
| Miami
| 
| Joe Johnson (24)
| Al Horford (22)
| Joe Johnson (5)
| Philips Arena19,157
| 33–25

|- bgcolor="#ffcccc"
| 59
| March 1
| Cleveland
| 
| Joe Johnson (21)
| Marvin Williams, Al Horford (10)
| Joe Johnson (4)
| Philips Arena19,639
| 33–26
|- bgcolor="#ccffcc"
| 60
| March 2
| @ Washington
| 
| Marvin Williams (28)
| Al Horford (8)
| Joe Johnson (13)
| Verizon Center10,189
| 34–26
|- bgcolor="#ffcccc"
| 61
| March 4
| @ New York
| 
| Al Horford (20)
| Al Horford (13)
| Joe Johnson (6)
| Madison Square Garden18,931
| 34–27
|- bgcolor="#ffcccc"
| 62
| March 6
| @ Charlotte
| 
| Al Horford (15)
| Marvin Williams (8)
| Mike Bibby (6)
| Time Warner Cable Arena15,058
| 34–28
|- bgcolor="#ccffcc"
| 63
| March 7
| Detroit
| 
| Josh Smith (19)
| Josh Smith, Al Horford (12)
| Joe Johnson (6)
| Philips Arena19,101
| 35–28
|- bgcolor="#ccffcc"
| 64
| March 9
| New Orleans
| 
| Joe Johnson (30)
| Josh Smith (13)
| Mike Bibby, Josh Smith, Acie Law (3)
| Philips Arena14,204
| 36–28
|- bgcolor="#ccffcc"
| 65
| March 11
| Utah
| 
| Joe Johnson (31)
| Al Horford, Josh Smith (12)
| Joe Johnson (9)
| Philips Arena13,112
| 37–28
|- bgcolor="#ccffcc"
| 66
| March 13
| Indiana
| 
| Joe Johnson (30)
| Al Horford (15)
| Joe Johnson, Mike Bibby (6)
| Philips Arena14,079
| 38–28
|- bgcolor="#ccffcc"
| 67
| March 15
| Portland
| 
| Joe Johnson (35)
| Josh Smith (8)
| Joe Johnson (6)
| Philips Arena14,413
| 39–28
|- bgcolor="#ccffcc"
| 68
| March 17
| Sacramento
| 
| Al Horford (23)
| Al Horford (12)
| Mike Bibby (7)
| Philips Arena14,226
| 40–28
|- bgcolor="#ccffcc"
| 69
| March 19
| Dallas
| 
| Joe Johnson (24)
| Josh Smith (9)
| Mike Bibby (7)
| Philips Arena17,499
| 41–28
|- bgcolor="#ffcccc"
| 70
| March 21
| @ Cleveland
| 
| Joe Johnson (24)
| Al Horford (11)
| Al Horford (6)
| Quicken Loans Arena20,562
| 41–29
|- bgcolor="#ccffcc"
| 71
| March 23
| Minnesota
| 
| Ronald Murray (30)
| Al Horford (13)
| Mike Bibby (9)
| Philips Arena13,425
| 42–29
|- bgcolor="#ffcccc"
| 72
| March 25
| San Antonio
| 
| Joe Johnson (30)
| Al Horford (13)
| Josh Smith (5)
| Philips Arena18,529
| 42–30
|- bgcolor="#ffcccc"
| 73
| March 27
| Boston
| 
| Joe Johnson, Josh Smith (22)
| Al Horford (14)
| Joe Johnson, Josh Smith (4)
| Philips Arena20,054
| 42–31
|- bgcolor="#ccffcc"
| 74
| March 29
| L.A. Lakers
| 
| Mike Bibby (21)
| Zaza Pachulia (13)
| Joe Johnson (8)
| Philips Arena20,148
| 43–31
|- bgcolor="#ffcccc"
| 75
| March 31
| @ Philadelphia
| 
| Josh Smith (33)
| Zaza Pachulia, Al Horford (8)
| Joe Johnson (7)
| Wachovia Center18,256
| 43–32

|- bgcolor="#ffcccc"
| 76
| April 3
| @ Boston
| 
| Ronald Murray (21)
| Josh Smith (10)
| Mike Bibby (6)
| TD Banknorth Garden18,624
| 43–33
|- bgcolor="#ffcccc"
| 77
| April 4
| Orlando
| 
| Joe Johnson (21)
| Al Horford (13)
| Mike Bibby (5)
| Philips Arena19,608
| 43–34
|- bgcolor="#ccffcc"
| 78
| April 7
| @ Toronto
| 
| Joe Johnson, Josh Smith (25)
| Al Horford (12)
| Mike Bibby (10)
| Air Canada Centre17,613
| 44–34
|- bgcolor="#ccffcc"
| 79
| April 8
| @ Milwaukee
| 
| Joe Johnson (30)
| Al Horford (9)
| Mike Bibby (8)
| Bradley Center13,073
| 45–34
|- bgcolor="#ccffcc"
| 80
| April 10
| Indiana
| 
| Josh Smith (30)
| Al Horford (15)
| Mike Bibby (9)
| Philips Arena17,222
| 46–34
|- bgcolor="#ccffcc"
| 81
| April 14
| Miami
| 
| Ronald Murray (17)
| Mario West (9)
| Ronald Murray (5)
| Philips Arena18,179 
| 47-34 
|- bgcolor="#ffcccc"
| 82
| April 15
| @ Memphis
| 
| Ronald Murray (29)
| Zaza Pachulia, Othello Hunter (9)
| Ronald Murray (6)
| FedExForum12,736
| 47-35
|-

Playoffs

|- align="center" bgcolor="#ccffcc"
| 1
| April 19
| Miami
| W 90–64
| Josh Smith (23)
| Smith, Pachulia (10)
| Mike Bibby (9)
| Philips Arena18,851
| 1–0
|- align="center" bgcolor="#ffcccc"
| 2
| April 22
| Miami
| L 93–108
| Mike Bibby (18)
| Al Horford (11)
| Al Horford (5)
| Philips Arena19,146
| 1–1
|- align="center" bgcolor="#ffcccc"
| 3
| April 25
| @ Miami
| L 78–107
| three players tied (13)
| Josh Smith (8)
| three players tied (3)
| American Airlines Arena19,600
| 1–2
|- align="center" bgcolor="#ccffcc"
| 4
| April 27
| @ Miami
| W 81–71
| Mike Bibby (15)
| Zaza Pachulia (18)
| Joe Johnson (5)
| American Airlines Arena19,600
| 2–2
|- align="center" bgcolor="#ccffcc"
| 5
| April 29
| Miami
| W 106–91
| Joe Johnson (25)
| Josh Smith (8)
| Joe Johnson (6)
| Philips Arena19,051
| 3–2
|- align="center" bgcolor="#ffcccc"
| 6
| May 1
| @ Miami
| L 72–98
| Mike Bibby (20)
| Josh Smith (10)
| Mike Bibby (3)
| American Airlines Arena19,600
| 3–3
|- align="center" bgcolor="#ccffcc"
| 7
| May 3
| Miami
| W 91–78
| Joe Johnson (27)
| Josh Smith (9)
| Mike Bibby (6)
| Philips Arena18,864
| 4–3
|-

|- align="center" bgcolor="#ffcccc"
| 1
| May 5
| @ Cleveland
| L 72–99
| Josh Smith (22)
| Al Horford (8)
| Mike Bibby (8)
| Quicken Loans Arena20,562
| 0–1
|- align="center" bgcolor="#ffcccc"
| 2
| May 7
| @ Cleveland
| L 85–105
| Maurice Evans (16)
| Zaza Pachulia (12)
| Maurice Evans (4)
| Quicken Loans Arena20,562
| 0–2
|- align="center" bgcolor="#ffcccc"
| 3
| May 9
| Cleveland
| L 82–97
| Joe Johnson (17)
| Smith, Johnson (5)
| Mike Bibby (5)
| Philips Arena20,143
| 0–3
|- align="center" bgcolor="#ffcccc"
| 4
| May 11
| Cleveland
| L 74–84
| Josh Smith (26)
| Josh Smith (8)
| Joe Johnson (7)
| Philips Arena19,241
| 0–4
|-

Player statistics

Legend

Season
Shaded block denotes team leader(s) in that statistic.

Free agents

On August 11, it was announced that Hawks forward Josh Smith will remain with the Hawks after the Hawks matched an offer sheet from the Memphis Grizzlies. The terms have not been disclosed but it's believed that Smith gets a five-year deal worth about $58 million.

Additions

Subtractions

References

Atlanta Hawks seasons
Atlanta
2008 in sports in Georgia (U.S. state)
2009 in sports in Georgia (U.S. state)